Sgurr nan Coireachan (956 m) is a mountain in the Northwest Highlands, Scotland. It lies north of Glenfinnan in Lochaber.

One of a pair of neighbouring Munros (the other being Sgurr Thuilm), it is a steep and rocky peak with great views from its summit. It is usually climbed from its southern Glennfinnan side.

References

Mountains and hills of the Northwest Highlands
Marilyns of Scotland
Munros